External sphincter muscle may refer to:

 External anal sphincter
 External sphincter muscle of female urethra
 External sphincter muscle of male urethra